The London and North Western Railway Experiment Class was a series of 30 three-cylinder 2-(2-2)-0 compound locomotives designed by Francis Webb for the London and North Western Railway between 1882 and 1884. They were Webb’s first large-scale experiment with a class of express compound locomotives, and the first engine was named accordingly. They were followed by a class of similar, but larger locomotives, that featured larger boilers and smaller driving wheels – the LNWR Dreadnought Class.

After Webb's retirement, his successor, George Whale, withdrew the Experiment class locomotives soon after he took up office in 1903.

Accidents and incidents

They were derailed and fouled the main line. Locomotive No. 520 Express was one of two hauling an express passenger train that collided with the wagons and was derailed. 14 people were killed and 48 were injured.

Locomotives

References

Experiment
2-2-2-0 locomotives
Railway locomotives introduced in 1882
Compound locomotives
Scrapped locomotives
Standard gauge steam locomotives of Great Britain